The United States Court of Appeals for the Fourth Circuit (in case citations, 4th Cir.) is a federal court located in Richmond, Virginia, with appellate jurisdiction over the district courts in the following districts:

District of Maryland
Eastern District of North Carolina
Middle District of North Carolina
Western District of North Carolina
District of South Carolina
Eastern District of Virginia
Western District of Virginia
Northern District of West Virginia
Southern District of West Virginia

The court is based at the Lewis F. Powell Jr. United States Courthouse in Richmond, Virginia. With 15 authorized judgeships, it is mid-sized among the 13 United States Courts of Appeals.


Current composition of the court 
:

Vacancies and pending nominations

List of former judges

Chief judges

Succession of seats

Practice in the 4th Circuit 
From 2000 to 2008, the Court had the highest rate of non-publication (92%) on the Federal Circuit.

The Chief Justice is always assigned to the Fourth Circuit as the circuit justice, due to Richmond's close proximity to Washington, D.C.

The Fourth Circuit is considered an extremely collegial court. By tradition, the Judges of the Fourth Circuit come down from the bench following each oral argument to greet the lawyers.

See also 
 Judicial appointment history for the Fourth Circuit
 List of current United States circuit judges
 Same-sex marriage in the Fourth Circuit

References

External links 
 United States Court of Appeals for the Fourth Circuit
 Recent opinions from Findlaw

 
Organizations based in Richmond, Virginia
Baltimore
Charleston, West Virginia
Alexandria, Virginia
Government of Raleigh, North Carolina
1891 establishments in the United States
Courts and tribunals established in 1891